The Ohio State Bar Association (OSBA) is a voluntary bar association for the state of Ohio.

History
OSBA was founded on March 6, 1880 when the Cleveland Bar Association issued a call other Ohio local bar associations to meet at Case Hall in Cleveland. More than 400 lawyers met on July 8 to form the Association; Rufus P. Ranney was chosen as its first president.

Today, membership includes almost 70 percent of all Ohio law practitioners. With the addition of paralegals, law students and other associate members, total membership is about 31,000. The OSBA does not license attorneys to practice law in Ohio; that function is administered by the Ohio Supreme Court.

The association was founded in 1880 and is based in the state capital of Columbus.

References

External links
 Official website

Ohio
Organizations established in 1880
1880 establishments in Ohio